Marcel Höttecke (born 25 April 1987) is a German former professional football goalkeeper.

Career
Höttecke was born in Lippstadt. He played mainly for Borussia Dortmund II but has played in the first team due to injuries of regular keepers Roman Weidenfeller and Marc Ziegler. His first match in Bundesliga was on 16 April 2008 losing to Hannover 96 3–1. On 20 April 2010, it was announced that he would transfer to 1. FC Union Berlin at the end of the season.

References

1987 births
Living people
People from Lippstadt
Sportspeople from Arnsberg (region)
Rot Weiss Ahlen players
Borussia Dortmund players
Borussia Dortmund II players
1. FC Union Berlin players
Berliner AK 07 players
German footballers
Germany youth international footballers
Bundesliga players
2. Bundesliga players
3. Liga players
Association football goalkeepers
Footballers from North Rhine-Westphalia
SV Lippstadt 08 players